Infante Manuel, Count of Ourém, KGF (Manuel José Francisco António Caetano Estêvão Bartolomeu; (Lisbon, 3 August 1697 - Quinta de Belas, 3 August 1766) was a Portuguese infante (prince), seventh child of Peter II, King of Portugal, and his wife Maria Sophia of Neuburg. He was the brother of King John V of Portugal. He was a candidate for the Polish throne.

Life 
He was born on 3 August 1697 in Lisbon and died unmarried and without legitimate issue at the Quinta de Belas in the same city on the same day in 1766. He is buried at the Royal Pantheon of the Braganza Dynasty in Lisbon.

Manuel led an adventurous life. At the age of 18, he embarked in secret on an English ship with destination the Netherlands. Ordered by his brother King John V of Portugal to return home, he disobeyed and went to Paris and then to Germany.

On 1 August 1716 he offered his services to Prince Eugene of Savoy, to fight the Turks in Hungary. There he fought 4 days later in the Battle of Petrovaradin where he was slightly wounded but covered with glory. He also participated in the pursuit of the fleeing Turks and the siege and capture of Timișoara.

In 1717, now officially in the Austrian army, he again fought under Prince Eugen and participated in the conquest of Belgrade.

After the Treaty of Passarowitz, he obtained the title of Maréchal de camp. After the war he traveled from court to court, living a life filled with pleasure, inspiring several contemporary writers. In 1721 he received the Order of the Golden Fleece.

In 1728 he became one of the candidates for the hand of the wealthy Maria Zofia Sieniawska supported by the Habsburgs in attempt to gain a strong position in Poland before the Royal Election. Well known at the Austrian and Russian court, he was even proposed as the next King of Poland for a short time in 1733, in the onset of the War of Polish Succession.

The next year he returned to Portugal, where he spent the last years of his life in the Quinta de Belas, leading a socially active life, surrounded by writers and artists. He died on his 69th birthday more than three decades later.

Ancestry

See also
Treaty of the Three Black Eagles

Literature 
Urszula Kosińska: Could a Portuguese Prince become King of Poland? The Candidacy of Don Manuel de Bragança for the Polish Throne in the Years 1729–33, In: The Slavonic and East European Review, Vol. 94, No. 3 (July 2016), pp. 497-508.

References

Candidates for the Polish elective throne
1697 births
1766 deaths
People from Lisbon
Portuguese infantes
Knights of the Golden Fleece of Austria
Burials at the Monastery of São Vicente de Fora
House of Braganza
17th-century Portuguese people
18th-century Portuguese people
Austro-Turkish War (1716–1718)
Sons of kings